The Austro-Hungarian Monarchy in Word and Picture or the Kronprinzenwerk ("Crown Prince's Work") is a 24-volume encyclopedia of regional studies, initiated in 1883 by Crown Prince Rudolf of Austria-Hungary.

The encyclopedia describes countries, peoples, landscapes and regions of the Austro-Hungarian Crown Lands. It was also published in a 21-volume Hungarian edition ("Az Osztrák-Magyar Monarchia írásban és képben"). The German edition was edited by the history and geography professor, Josef Weil von Weilen (1830-1889), while the Hungarian edition was edited by the novelist and dramatist Mór Jókai. Only the German edition was financially successful. The Hungarian edition includes some anti-Semitic remarks that are missing from the German edition.

They contain 587 contributions, totaling 12,596 pages with  4,529 illustrations. The articles were written by 432 contributors, including Crown Prince Rudolf himself.

Volumes and dates
 Vienna and Lower Austria, 1st section: Vienna (Wien und Niederösterreich, 1. Abtheilung: Wien), 1886
 Summary 1. section: Nature Historical Theil (Übersichtsband, 1. Abtheilung: Naturgeschichtlicher Theil), 1887
 Overview, 2nd section: Historical Theil (Übersichtsband, 2. Abtheilung: Geschichtlicher Theil), 1887
 Vienna and Lower Austria, 2nd section: Lower Austria (Wien und Niederösterreich, 2. Abtheilung: Niederösterreich), 1888
 Hungary, Part 1 (Ungarn, Band 1), 1888
 Upper Austria and Salzburg (Oberösterreich und Salzburg), 1889
 Styria (Steiermark), 1890
 Carinthia and Krain (Kärnten und Krain), 1891
 Hungary, Part 2 (Ungarn, Band 2), 1891
 The Littoral (Gorizia, Gradiska, Trieste and Istria) (Das Küstenland (Görz, Gradiska, Triest und Istrien), 1891
 Dalmatia (Dalmatien), 1892
 Hungary, Part 3 (Ungarn, Band 3), 1893
 Vorarlberg and the Tyrol (Tirol und Vorarlberg), 1893
 Bohemia, Part 1 (Böhmen, Band 1), 1896
 Bohemia, Part 2 (Böhmen, Band 2), 1896
 Hungary, Part 4 (Ungarn, Band 4), 1896
 Moravia and Silesia (Mähren und Schlesien), 1897
 Hungary, Part 5, 1st section (Ungarn, Band 5, 1. Abtheilung), 1898
 Galicia (Galicien), 1898
 Bukovina (Bukowina), 1899
 Hungary, Part 5, 2nd section (Ungarn, Band 5, 2. Abtheilung), 1900
 Bosnia and Hercegovina (Bosnien und Hercegowina), 1901
 Hungary, Part 6 (Ungarn, Band 6), 1902
 Croatia and Slavonia (Croatien und Slavonien), 1902

The volume number corresponds to the list at the end of the 24th volume. Notably, Poland is not mentioned in the encyclopaedia because, at the time, the Imperial partitions of Poland were considered final by the German authorities in the Kingdom of Prussia as well as Austria-Hungary.

Gallery

See also 
 List of encyclopedias by language

References

External links 
 The encyclopedia at Internet Archive

1886 non-fiction books
1887 non-fiction books
1888 non-fiction books
1889 non-fiction books
1890 non-fiction books
1891 non-fiction books
1892 non-fiction books
1893 non-fiction books
1896 non-fiction books
1897 non-fiction books
1898 non-fiction books
1899 non-fiction books
1900 non-fiction books
1901 non-fiction books
1902 non-fiction books
19th-century encyclopedias
20th-century encyclopedias
Works about Austria-Hungary
German-language encyclopedias